The 28th Boat Race between crews from the University of Oxford and the University of Cambridge took place on the River Thames on the 1 April 1871. The race, umpired by Joseph William Chitty, was won by Cambridge by one length in a time of 23 minutes 10 seconds for their second consecutive victory.

Background

The Boat Race is a side-by-side rowing competition between the University of Oxford (sometimes referred to as the "Dark Blues") and the University of Cambridge (sometimes referred to as the "Light Blues").  The race was first held in 1829, and since 1845 has taken place on the  Championship Course on the River Thames in southwest London.  Cambridge went into the race as reigning champions, having defeated Oxford by three lengths in the previous year's race, while Oxford led overall with sixteen wins to Cambridge's eleven.

Oxford were coached by W. D. Benson (their non-rowing president, who had rowed three times for the Dark Blues in the 1868, 1869 and 1870 races).  Cambridge's coach was John Graham Chambers (who rowed in the 1862 and 1863 race, and was a non-rowing president for the 1865 race) and John Hilton Ridley (who rowed in the 1869 and 1870 races).

The race was umpired by Joseph William Chitty who had rowed for Oxford twice in 1849 (in the March and December races) and the 1852 race, while the starter was Edward Searle.

Crews
The Oxford crew weighed an average of 12 st 4.125 lb (76.1 kg),  more than their opponents.  The Cambridge crew saw only three new rowers, with five returning from the 1870 race, including the Cambridge University Boat Club president John Goldie and William Henry Lowe in their third appearance in the event, along with the cox Henry Erskine Gordon.  Similarly, Oxford saw five of their crew return, including S. H. Woodhouse at bow and Thomas Southey Baker who were participating in their third Boat Races.

Race

There was "little or no tide and head wind over part of the course" according to Drinkwater.  Cambridge won the toss and elected to start from the Surrey station, handing the Middlesex station to Oxford.  The umpire, Chitty, got the race underway at 10.08 a.m., with Cambridge taking an early lead.  The Light Blues had a clear water advantage by the Point and held a two-length lead by the time the crews shot Hammersmith Bridge.  Despite a spurt instigated by Oxford stroke Robert Lesley at Barnes Bridge, Goldie remained steady until, before the final twenty strokes, he increased the stroke rate and saw Cambridge home by one length in a time of 23 minutes 10 seconds for their second consecutive victory and took the overall record to 16–12 in Oxford's favour.

References
Notes

Bibliography

External links
 Official website

1871 in English sport
The Boat Race
April 1871 sports events